Pes-caprae  is Latin for "goat's foot" and may refer to:
 Ipomoea pes-caprae, the beach morning glory or goat's foot, a common tropical creeping vine species that grows on the upper parts of beaches
 Oxalis pes-caprae, the Bermuda buttercup, African wood-sorrel, Bermuda sorrel, buttercup oxalis, Cape sorrel, English weed, goat's-foot, sourgrass, soursob or soursop, a flowering plant species
 Scutiger pes-caprae, a fungus in the family Albatrellaceae.